The Cértima River is a river in Portugal that runs through the freguesia of Barrô e Aguada de Baixo, in Águeda Municipality, Aveiro District.

See also
List of rivers in Portugal

References

Rivers of Portugal
Ramsar sites in Portugal